Carroll Community School District is a public school district headquartered in Carroll, Iowa.

The district, entirely within Carroll County, serves Carroll, Breda, Dedham, Halbur, Lidderdale, and Willey, as well as most of Templeton. The mascot of the Carroll Community School District is the Carroll Tigers.

Schools
 Carroll High School
 Carroll Middle School
 Adams Elementary School
 Fairview Elementary Schoo

Carroll High School

Athletics 
The Tigers compete in the Raccoon River Conference in the following sports:

Fall Sports
Cross Country (boys and girls)
Swimming (girls)
Volleyball (girls)
 1972 State Champions
Football

Winter Sports
Basketball (boys and girls)
 Girls' - 2-time Class 3A State Champions (1996, 1997) 
Wrestling (boys and girls)
Swimming (boys)

Spring Sports
Track and Field (boys and girls)
 Boys' - 2-time State Champions (1927, 1957)
Golf (boys and girls)
 Girls' - 2009 Class 3A State Champions
Tennis (boys and girls)
Soccer (girls)
Baseball
Softball

Carroll High School Extracurriculars (A-Z)
Fall Play: A play/musical is performed each year during the fall at CHS. 
FFA: The Carroll Area FFA Chapter is open to high school students in the surrounding school districts: Carroll Community School District, Kuemper Catholic Schools, and also Ar-we-va. The Carroll Area FFA Chapter was established in 1992. 
Jazz Band: CHS offers a jazz band for students grades 9–12, taking place in the 2nd semester of the year. The jazz band has performed at competitions in past years.
Marching Band: The CHS Tiger Pride Marching Band is open to students in grades 9–12. The Carroll High School Marching Band performs at home football games, Carroll's annual band day parade, and also has made multiple appearances in multi-school competitions. In 2018 and 2019, the CHS band participated in the IHSMA Marching Band Competition.

See also
List of school districts in Iowa
List of high schools in Iowa

References

External links
 Carroll Community School District

School districts in Iowa
Education in Carroll County, Iowa